Brighton is an unincorporated community in Tift County, in the U.S. state of Georgia.

History
A post office was in operation at Brighton from 1900 until 1905. According to tradition, the community was named after a place of the same name in Connecticut.

References

Unincorporated communities in Tift County, Georgia